The 1977–78 season was Real Madrid Club de Fútbol's 75th season in existence and the club's 46th consecutive season in the top flight of Spanish football.

Summary
The club did not compete in UEFA competitions for the first time since the 1954–55 season. During the summer, the team was reinforced with the arrivals of: Argentine defender Enrique Wolff, and high-expected Forward Juanito from Burgos CF. Bernabeu traveled to West Germany seeking to replace Paul Breitner by signing Borussia Mönchengladbach's star Herbert Wimmer, but once he saw midfielder Uli Stielike play, he changed his mind and transferred the latter in to the club. 

President Santiago Bernabéu suffered a bowel obstruction on 29 August 1977 and was transferred into hospital for emergency treatment being diagnosed with cancer days later. After three seasons, Miljan Miljanić left the club on 8 September 1977 signing an agreement with Santiago Bernabéu at the hospital in a bizarre event. Then, Luis Molowny was appointed by Raimundo Saporta as new head coach. Also, Saporta was appointed as Acting President on 3 September 1977 due to Bernabeu health issues.

In spite of the turmoil, the club clinched its 18th League title ever closing the season on 7 May 1978 six points above runners-up FC Barcelona. Chairman Santiago Bernabéu died on 2 June 1978 ending Real Madrid's most successful era, with the club clinching 6 European Cups and 16 League titles under his presidency.

Squad

Transfers

Competitions

La Liga

Position by round

League table

Matches

Copa del Rey

First round

Second round

Third round

Round of 32
Bye

Round of 16

Statistics

Players statistics

Notes

References

External links 
 BDFútbol

Real Madrid CF seasons
Spanish football championship-winning seasons
Real Madrid